The MIT Sloan School of Management (MIT Sloan or Sloan) is the business school of the Massachusetts Institute of Technology, a private university in Cambridge, Massachusetts.
MIT Sloan offers bachelor's, master's, and doctoral degree programs, as well as executive education. Its degree programs are among the most selective in the world.
MIT Sloan emphasizes innovation in practice and research. Many influential ideas in management and finance originated at the school, including the Black–Scholes model, the Solow–Swan model, the random walk hypothesis, the binomial options pricing model, and the field of system dynamics. The faculty has included numerous Nobel laureates in economics and John Bates Clark Medal winners.

History

The MIT Sloan School of Management began in 1914 as the engineering administration curriculum ("Course 15") in the MIT Department of Economics and Statistics. The scope and depth of this educational focus grew steadily in response to advances in the theory and practice of management.

A program offering a master's degree in management was established in 1925. The world's first university-based mid-career education program—the Sloan Fellows program—was created in 1931 under the sponsorship of Alfred P. Sloan, himself an 1895 MIT graduate, who was the chief executive officer of General Motors and has since been credited with creating the modern corporation. An Alfred P. Sloan Foundation grant established the MIT School of Industrial Management in 1952 with the charge of educating the "ideal manager". In 1964, the school was renamed in Sloan's honor as the Alfred P. Sloan School of Management. In the following decades, the school grew to the point that in 2000, management became the second-largest undergraduate major at MIT. In 2005, an undergraduate minor in management was opened to 100 students each year. In 2014, the school celebrated 100 years of management education at MIT.

Since its founding, the school has initiated many international efforts to improve regional economies and positively shape the future of global business. In the 1960s, the school played a leading role in founding the first Indian Institute of Management. Other initiatives include the MIT-China Management Education Project, the International Faculty Fellows Program, and partnerships with IESE Business School in Spain, Sungkyunkwan University in South Korea, Universidade Nova de Lisboa in Portugal, the Skolkovo Moscow School of Management in Russia, and Tsinghua University in China. In 2014, the school launched the MIT Regional Entrepreneurship Acceleration Program (REAP), which brings leaders from developing regions to MIT for two years to improve their economies. In 2015, MIT worked in collaboration with the Central Bank of Malaysia to establish Asia School of Business in Kuala Lumpur, Malaysia.

Academics

The curriculum is focused on action learning, which requires that students apply concepts learned in the classroom to real-world business settings. Courses are taught using the case method, lectures, team projects, and hands-on Action Learning Labs. The academic level of coursework is considered extremely demanding by business school standards, with a greater emphasis on analytical reasoning and quantitative analysis than most programs.

Academic rigor has a strong influence on the school's culture. The first semester, also known as the core, is often considered the most difficult semester by design. Courses are graded using letter grades and on the standard five-point MIT scale. In its graduate programs, anything less than a 4.0 ('B') average will result in the student not being allowed to graduate. Unlike most business schools, MIT Sloan does not offer any academic honors at graduation, consistent with the practice throughout all of MIT. The philosophy behind this is that the 'honor' is in being an MIT graduate.

MIT Sloan closely collaborates with other parts of MIT, in particular the School of Engineering, the School of Science, and the Department of Economics. A special joint degree program with the School of Engineering is the Leaders for Global Operations (LGO) program, where students concurrently complete an MBA and a Master of Science in Engineering. Another joint degree program aimed at students with more industry experience (an average of 8 to 10 years) is the System Design and Management (SDM) program, where students complete a Master of Science in Engineering and Management. Whereas Sloan Fellows focus primarily on management coursework, LGO and SDM fellows complete a relatively equal mixture of engineering and management coursework.

MIT also collaborates extensively with Harvard University, and students at each institution often pursue simultaneous degrees at the other. MIT Sloan students can freely cross-register for courses at Harvard Business School, and vice versa—the only leading business schools to have such an agreement. As a result, a number of courses have been created at each institution that regularly attract cross-registered students. MIT Sloan and the Harvard Kennedy School offer a formal dual degree program.

In a 2014 article, the school's Dewey Library was rated the best business school library in the country. In 2016, the school's MBA program was ranked #2 worldwide for social and environmental impact by Corporate Knights magazine.

Student life

MIT Sloan students and alumni informally call themselves Sloanies. The MIT Sloan culture is similar to, but also distinct from, overall MIT culture, and is influenced most strongly by its MBA program. MBA students come from more than 60 countries every year, with just over half coming from North America, and 60% holding US citizenship. Prior to business school, engineering is the most popular undergraduate major among students. 46% of the class is female.

Creativity and invention are constant themes at the school. The MBA track in Entrepreneurship & Innovation features action learning labs which pair students with companies to learn how to solve complex problems relating to emerging technologies. These action learning labs include Entrepreneurship Lab, Innovation Teams, and Leading Sustainable Systems Lab. Global Entrepreneurship Lab and Global Health Delivery Lab send MBA students to work onsite with startups in different parts of the world. The Martin Trust Center for MIT Entrepreneurship, one of the few business school entrepreneurship centers in the world focused on high tech, offers many other entrepreneurial activities and mentorship throughout the year. The annual MIT $100K Entrepreneurship Competition is one of the largest business plan competitions in the world, helping to launch more than 130 companies with a market capitalization of over $15 billion.

A staple of MIT Sloan MBA life is the weekly C-Function, which stands for "cultural function" or "consumption function". The school sponsors food and drink for all members of the MIT Sloan graduate community to enjoy entertainment organized by specific campus cultural groups or clubs as well as parties with non-cultural themes. C-Functions are usually held most Thursdays in the Walker Memorial building, which is also used as the venue for many other MIT Sloan community events. MIT Sloan alumni groups around the world also organize C-Functions for their club members, for social and networking activities.

Students at MIT Sloan run over 70 active clubs. Some of the most popular clubs are the Sloan Women in Management Club; the Entrepreneurship & Innovation Club; the Design Club; the Finance Club; the Management Consulting Club; the Entertainment, Media and Sports Club; the Venture Capital and Private Equity Club; the Product Management Club; and the Technology Club. The Sloan Business Club is the official undergraduate business club for all MIT students.

Throughout the school year, a number of professional and academic conferences are organized by, or in partnership with, the school. Annual highlights include the MIT $100K Entrepreneurship Competition, the MIT Venture Capital & Innovation Conference, the Sloan Women in Management Breaking the Mold Conference, the MIT Sloan CIO Symposium, and the MIT Sloan CFO Summit. The most visible conference—and the largest student-run conference in the world—is the MIT Sloan Sports Analytics Conference, which Fast Company ranked the #3 most innovative sports company, behind only the NFL and MLB Advanced Media. The conference brings managers, players, and coaches from over 80 professional sports teams together with journalists, researchers, and students from over 170 different schools. With its focus on analytics in the sports industry, Bill James, the creator of Sabermetrics, said that "this conference is a culmination of 30 years of my work."

Like the rest of the institute, MIT Sloan students have an extended period between semesters reserved for special activities. During the month of January, there are no formal classes at the school; instead, they are replaced by what is known as the Independent Activities Period (IAP). During IAP, students engage in activities that would be challenging to participate in alongside regular classes, often including international travel programs. In the middle of semesters, the MBA program has an additional, shorter gap, called the Sloan Innovation Period (SIP), focusing on intensive experiential leadership activities outside of the classroom.

After commencement, MIT Sloan graduates wear the MIT class ring, known as the Brass Rat. Top recruiters of new MBA graduates of the school include Apple, Google, Goldman Sachs, McKinsey & Company, Nike and Amazon. The school has over 20,000 alumni globally in 90 countries, with more than 20% who are presidents or CEOs. More than 650 companies have been founded by alumni of the school, including Akamai, E*Trade, Gartner, Genentech, HubSpot, Lotus Software, Teradyne, Zipcar, and Okta.

Faculty

Deans

Notable current and former faculty

Notable alumni

See also
 Economics
 Glossary of economics
 MIT Center for Collective Intelligence
 MIT Center for Digital Business
 MIT Center for Entrepreneurship
 MIT Center for Information Systems Research
 MIT Laboratory for Information and Decision Systems

References

External links

 
 Course materials on MIT OpenCourseWare (OCW)
 MIT Sloan Management Review Polska

Business schools in Massachusetts
Educational institutions established in 1914
Massachusetts Institute of Technology
1914 establishments in Massachusetts
University subdivisions in Massachusetts